SS Edwin G. Weed was a Liberty ship built in the United States during World War II. She was named after Edwin G. Weed, the third bishop of Florida in the Episcopal Church.

Construction
Edwin G. Weed was laid down on 7 December 1943, under a Maritime Commission (MARCOM) contract, MC hull 1221, by the St. Johns River Shipbuilding Company, Jacksonville, Florida; she was sponsored by Miss Margaret G. Weed, the sister of the namesake, and was launched on 29 January 1944.

History
She was allocated to the South Atlantic Steamship Lines, on 11 February 1944. On 27 May 1946, she was laid up in the Hudson River Reserve Fleet, Jones Point, New York. She was sold, 27 December 1946, to Italy, for $544,506, for commercial use. She was removed from the fleet on 3 January 1947. Edwin G. Weed was renamed Eugenio C. in 1947. In 1963, she was sold and named Aris and reflagged for Liberia. She was scrapped in 1967.

References

Bibliography

 
 
 
 

 

Liberty ships
Ships built in Jacksonville, Florida
1944 ships
Hudson River Reserve Fleet
Liberty ships transferred to Italy